Aviator was the debut album by rock band Aviator. Released in early 1979,  Aviator was co-produced by the band and Robin Lumley from the British jazz-fusion band, Brand X. The studio album was released with a total run time of 43:32.

Track listing
All tracks composed by Aviator
 "Your Loving is My Home" (3:30)
 "Keep Your Heart Right" (6:21)
 "Evil Eye" (3:20)
 "Time Traveller" (2:59)
 "Silver Needles" (6:07)
 "Cleveland Ohio" (5:01)
 "Country Morning" (6:14)
 "Greed" (3:02)
 "Morning Journey" (6:58)

Personnel
Aviator 
Jack Lancaster - lyricon, soprano, alto and tenor saxophones, computone, synthesizer
Mick Rogers - guitar, vocals
John G. Perry - bass, bass pedals, vocals
Clive Bunker - drums, percussion
Technical
David Tickle, Roger T. Wake, Stephen W. Tayler - engineer

References

1979 debut albums
Aviator (British band) albums
Harvest Records albums
EMI America Records albums